The Hong Kong tropical cyclone warning signals, or informally typhoon signals, are a set of signals used to indicate the threat or effects of a tropical cyclone. The Hong Kong Observatory issues the warning signal if a tropical cyclone approaches within  of Hong Kong and poses a threat of deteriorating conditions in Hong Kong.

The signals are represented as a set of numbers and symbols. Previously lights were also used at night.

Signal System

Beginning
Local people in Hong Kong were warned of the hazardous wind conditions associated with tropical cyclones by means of a typhoon gun as early as August 1884. At the time, the typhoon gun was placed at the foot of the mast in front of the Police Barracks at Tsim Sha Tsui facing Victoria Harbour. It was fired once whenever a strong gale of wind was expected. It was fired twice whenever the wind was expected to blow with typhoon force and fired again if possible when the wind was likely to suddenly shift around. However, it was noted that the typhoon gun also performed its double duty as the mail gun in announcing the arrival of postal services from London at the time, causing local vessels and people to seek shelter from a non-existent typhoon.

Night signals using lanterns were introduced in late 1890 and they were hoisted on the mast beside the time-ball in Tsim Sha Tsui Police Barracks (the time-ball was used to provide the time service since January 1885). The night signals provided indications that bad weather would be expected and the veering or backing of the winds. Thus, warnings on local weather and wind conditions were provided by the firing of typhoon gun and the night signals while the non-local signals provided information on the tropical cyclone positions around the time. Starting from around 1898, the signals (including the non-local and night signals) were repeated at the Godown Company in Kowloon in addition to that in Tsim Sha Tsui Barracks and also, by day only, at the Harbour Office (located in Sheung Wan, Hong Kong Island) and on H.M.’s Receiving Ship. By then, only one round of the typhoon gun was fired to warn of strong gale of winds as it was considered that the advance warning was adequate.

In February 1897, the storm signals invented by Admiral Fitzroy in 1861 were introduced in Hong Kong with a minor modification, and the typhoon gun was fired when the drum was hoisted. The modified FitzRoy's storm warning system consisted of storm signals in the form of a cone or drum and night signals. A cone pointing upward (North Cone) was hoisted for warning of gales from the north or east while a cone pointing downwards (South Cone) warned of gales from the south or west. A drum was added to the cone when a strong gale which might reach hurricane force was expected. The night signal consisted of three lanterns with white or any colour but all alike, hung on a triangular frame, pointing upwards or downwards as the case might be. No lanterns were hoisted to represent the drum. In January 1898, at the suggestions of the Committee of the Chamber of Commerce, it was reverted to the system which had been in use in Hong Kong from 1884 to 1896 as the original system was considered to be better understood and interpreted by the boat and seafaring community.

After the disastrous storm that battered Hong Kong in September 1906 and resulted in over 10,000 deaths, a small committee consisting of the harbour master, a nominee of the commodore and a nominee of the Chamber of Commerce was set up to review the need to improve storm warning system for the local public. Based on the suggestions by the committee, the typhoon gun, which had been used to warn of a strong gale of wind since 1884, was abolished in 1907. Its place was taken up by the urgent signal of firing three explosive bombs at the Water Police Station in Tsim Sha Tsui, at intervals of ten seconds when the winds were expected to increase to full hurricane force. This was repeated at the Harbour Office. A Black Cross was also hoisted at the same time, superior to other shapes (that is above all the non-local signals), to indicate winds of hurricane force. Moreover, the night signals were re-organised with three vertical lights in green and red. The new night signals, mounted on the roof of the Water Police Station at Tsim Sha Tsui, were repeated at the Harbour Office and on board H.M.S. Tamar and thus was visible in all parts of the harbour. In addition, Supplementary Warnings in the form of a cone would be hoisted at nine outlying stations such as Waglan Island, Gap Rock and Aberdeen to inform passers-by that storm signals were hoisted in the harbour. The night signals were transferred from the Water Police Station to the Kowloon Railway Station in 1916.

First Numbered System
A major revision to the storm signal system took place in 1917 when the new local and non-local storm signal codes were introduced on 1 July. The new local code was the first numbered tropical cyclone signal system in Hong Kong, consisting of seven signals (1 to 7)providing a standby signal, gale signals in four directions (N'ly, S'ly, E'ly and W'ly), an increasing gale signal and a hurricane signal. The hurricane signal was accompanied by three explosive bombs fired at the Water Police Station and repeated at the Harbour Office.

A change to the symbol for Signal No. 1 was effected in 1927. Towards the close of 1929, the rattan symbols of the Local Signal Code were replaced by symbols of expanded metal on steel frames, which, though of different design, had the same appearance as the old symbols, at a distance.

Conference of Directors of Far Eastern Weather Services
The local signal code was revised on 1 March 1931 following the recommendations at the Conference of Directors of Far Eastern Weather Services in 1930. The signal system was extended to ten signals (1 to 10), although Signal No. 4 was only used in the Philippines but not in Hong Kong, as the information it conveyed was covered by the non-local signals. In 1935, the signal system was further revised as agreed between the Observatory and the Central Weather Bureau of Manila. In the revised system, Signals No. 2 to 4 were not used in Hong Kong while Signal No. 9 was not used in Manila. Explosive bombs continued to be fired when the Hurricane Signal was hoisted. The last typhoon bomb was set off in September 1937 during the passage of an intense typhoon which brought extensive casualties and damage to Hong Kong.

After the Second World War, the previous tropical cyclone warning system was reinstated.

“Local Strong Wind Signal”
Following the recommendations of a conference on Storm Warning Procedures held in Manila in May 1949, the international warning signal for strong winds, in the form of a black ball, was brought into use in Hong Kong since 1 January 1950. The purpose of this new “Local Strong Wind Signal” was to warn small craft of the onset of strong winds that were not expected to reach gale force. It covered warning of strong monsoon winds in winter, and strong winds due to less intense tropical disturbances in summer and autumn. It was not intended to be used as a preliminary signal to give warning of the approach of a tropical storm or typhoon which was expected to give winds of gale force or above in Hong Kong. According to the records, the Local Strong Wind Signal was occasionally hoisted to warn the strong winds associated with tropical cyclones between 1950 and 1956. In some cases, it was also followed by gale warnings (i.e. Signals No. 5 to 8). Moreover, the Director of the Observatory reported in the Annual Report that owing to the lack of weather information from the mainland, it was very difficult to use the signal effectively for giving warning of strong monsoon winds in winter.

With effect from 15 April 1956, the Strong Monsoon Signal (Black Ball) and the new Tropical Cyclone Strong Wind Signal No. 3 (inverted T) were introduced to delineate the use of signals for monsoon systems and tropical cyclones. The Strong Monsoon Signal was used only as a warning against strong winter and summer monsoon winds and the black ball was displayed whenever monsoon winds were forecast or known to exceed 21 knots (40 kilometres per hour) in Victoria Harbour or coastal waters. A new signal, No. 3, was introduced as the warning for strong winds associated with tropical cyclones. Occasionally, when Hong Kong was under the combined effect of monsoon and tropical cyclone, the Strong Monsoon Signal might be replaced by tropical cyclone signals and vice versa depending on the synoptic conditions at the time. This practice is still valid today.

Renumbering
Originally, Gale or Storm Signals 5, 6, 7, 8 were different only in terms of local wind direction. In 1971–1972, a review of the local storm warning system was conducted by the Observatory. Letters and questionnaires were sent to shipping companies, government departments and other organisations to find out whether the majority of people in Hong Kong wanted to change the existing storm warning signals to make them simpler in that increasing signal number would indicate increasing winds. Starting from 1 January 1973, signals numbered 5, 6, 7 and 8 were re-numbered as 8NW, 8SW, 8NE and 8SE respectively to avoid giving the impression that the interchange of Signals 5, 6, 7, 8 carried a meaning of increasing or diminishing wind strength. This system remains in use today.

Conclusion
Since the last major revision in the local signal system in 1973, some adjustments had also been made in the interim years, including the introduction of the Pre-8 advance alert in 1987 and the setting up of a network of eight reference stations for considering the issuance of Tropical Cyclone Warning Signals No. 3 and No. 8 in 2007. Despite such changes, the meanings of the signals remain the same for more than 40 years, and the local tropical cyclone warning system has become firmly established with the public showing good awareness and response in dealing with the hazardous weather conditions warned by the tropical cyclone signals. The significant reduction of the number of fatalities brought by tropical cyclones to Hong Kong clearly reflects the effectiveness of the tropical cyclone warning system.

Signal stations

History
In 1917, a numbered signal system was implemented for warning wind conditions in the territory. Different signals were illustrated by different symbols and these were hoisted to indicate the prevailing wind conditions. Initially, the local day signals were displayed at the mast head of the storm signal mast on Blackhead Hill, the Harbour Office, Green Island signal mast, the flagstaff of the premises of Kowloon Wharf and Godown Company in Kowloon, the flagstaff on the premises of the Standard Oil Company in Lai Chi Kok and the flagstaff near the Field Officer's Quarters at Lyemun. Night signals were displayed at the tower of the Railway Station, on HMS Tamar and on the Harbour Office flagstaff. Supplementary signals in the form of a cone were also displayed at Gap Rock, Waglan Island, Stanley, Aberdeen, Shau Kei Wan, Sai Kung, Sha Tau Kok and Tai Po whenever local signals were displayed in the harbour.

Since the China Seas Storm Signal Code started to include a time signal code at the mast head which formerly was reserved for local signals, it became necessary to select a new site for hoisting the local signals. At the suggestion of the Director of the Observatory, hoisting of local signals was moved to the Observatory wireless mast. As the Observatory was further away from the harbour than Signal Hill, the height of the signals was extended to 2.4 metres and other dimensions of the signals were increased in proportion. The night and day signals of the local storm signals started to be displayed on the Observatory wireless mast on 3 October 1919 and 1 June 1920 respectively. In 1933, the wireless mast was removed from its original position to make way for the Director's Quarters. The new wireless mast was set up a little to the northeast of the Main (1883) Building.

Peak
The local signal stations were initially set up in the harbour and the outlying islands. As the population grew after the Second World War, signal stations gradually increased in number across the territory in addition to signal stations at the Hong Kong Observatory Headquarters and outstations at Cheung Chau and Waglan Island. A number of old signal masts in the New Territories and the outlying islands had to be repaired, and several new signal stations were brought into use. Most of the signal stations were located at government buildings of the Hong Kong Police Force and the Marine Department.

In 1961, visual signals displayed at 30 signal stations in various parts of Hong Kong. During the year, the Marine Department signal station at Blackhead Hill commenced showing local signals. In addition, equipment for showing full signals was installed in Aberdeen Police Station, Castle Peak Police Station, Cheung Chau Police Station, Stanvac Installation in Lai Chi Kok, Sai Kung Police Station, Shau Kei Wan Marine Licensing Office, Stanley Village Police Station, Tai O Police Station and Caltex Oil Company Depot in Tsuen Wan.

In 1962, visual signals displayed at 33 signal stations in various parts of Hong Kong. During the year, new signal stations were completed at Sha Tin Police Station, Pat Heung Police Station, Rennie's Mill Police Station, Mui Wo Police Station, Shek Pik Police Post, and also at the Shell Oil Company Installation at Kwun Tong. The signals at H.M. Dockyard, Sha Tau Kok Police Station and Tai Po Island House were moved to H.M.S. Tamar, Sha Tau Kok Medical Department Clinic and Tai Po Magistracy respectively. All the remaining supplementary stations, namely Lok Ma Chau Police Station, Ping Shan Police Station, Stanley Fort and Waglan Island, were converted to show full signals.

In 1963, a new visual signal was completed at Lau Fau Shan Police Station in Deep Bay. New night stations were installed at the San Miguel Brewery in Sham Tseng and the Port Signal Station at North Point. This brought the total number of visual signal stations in Hong Kong to 35.

In 1964, a storm signal station established at the Marine Licensing Office, Shau Kei Wan, was brought in to operation. The total number of storm signal stations in Hong Kong was then 36.

In 1965, new storm signal stations, displaying both day and night signals were established at Tai Po Kau Marine Police Operations Base, Tai Lam Chung Marine Police Operations Base, Tai Mei Tuk Police Post at Plover Cove and Yuen Long Divisional Police Headquarters.

In 1966, a new storm signal station displaying both day and night signals was established at the Ha Mei Wan Police Post, Lamma Island. Signal stations at the Mobil Oil Depot Lai Chi Kok and at Hei Ling Chau Police Station ceased operation.

In 1967, a new storm signal station displaying both day and night signals was established at Peng Chau Police Station. There are altogether 41 signal stations in Hong Kong.

The number of signal stations in Hong Kong peaked at 42 in the 1960s. 

(^ = Day signals only and * = Night signals only)

In 1969, there were altogether 39 signal stations. Aberdeen Police Station was vacated in October 1969 and the signal mast were removed to the top of the Fisheries Research Station in Aberdeen early in 1970.

Here are the signal stations as at 31 March 1972:

Closing progressively
With the development of alternative communication channels, such as radio and TV, Dial-a-Weather telephone service, and Observatory website, in disseminating weather information and warnings, the signal stations were progressively closed in the late 1970s.

The wireless mast for hoisting signals at the Observatory was dismantled in 1978 for the construction of the new Centenary Building to the east of the Main (1883) Building.

The signal station at Sha Tin Police Station ceased to operate when the police station was removed in early 1979. On 31 March 1980, there were 37 signal stations in Hong Kong and they are listed below:

(* = Night signals only)

The viewing of the signal masts is made difficult by the many high-rise buildings. By late 1990, only 12 signal stations are retained to provide visual display of signals, mainly to vessels in or near the harbour.

Decommissioning
With effect from 1 April 2000, signals will no longer be hoisted at the signal stations at Aberdeen Marine Office, Sha Tau Kok Sewage Treatment Works and Tai Lam Small Boat Unit Headquarters.

With effect from 21 April 2001, signals will no longer be hoisted at the signal station at Lau Fau Shan Police Station.

With effect from 1 January 2002, signals will no longer be hoisted at the signal station at Cheung Chau Aeronautical Meteorological Station.

The decommissioning of Hong Kong's last signal station at Cheung Chau marked the end of an era of signal stations. From now on, tropical cyclone and strong monsoon signals will be "issued" or "cancelled" rather than "hoisted" or "lowered". The signals are now preserved as historical exhibits, such as those displayed at the Observatory Headquarters and Cheung Chau Meteorological Station.

Current system 

In accordance with legal codes and custom in Hong Kong, once any signal higher than No. 3 is issued, all government agencies shut down their operations, schools immediately cease classes, and financial markets and most of the private sector close their doors. Non-essential workers are released from work in a staggered manner so as to avoid overwhelming public transportation. Public transit agencies that operate on the sea or on surface streets and highways generally continue to operate initially but may cease operation at short notice. Employers who require staff to remain on duty during a No. 8 or higher signal must provide a safe work environment and shelter after work should transportation be unavailable. Such arrangements must be worked out beforehand between the employer and employee. In order to minimise disruption, the Hong Kong Observatory has, since 1987, observed a practice of issuing warnings two hours in advance of the issuance of the  No. 8 warning signal, though such warnings of warnings are not attended by any system of numbering such as to indicate the relative imminence of issuance of the typhoon warning signal itself.

In its early days, as a system devised for the service of mariners, it relied upon wind speeds measured around Victoria Harbour. As the emphasis shifted to serving the intensively urbanised populace, such observations were seen as lacking relevance. The Hong Kong Observatory was the target of criticism during Typhoon Prapiroon in 2006 when conditions in urban areas were much more severe than those on the harbour which had justified only a No. 3 signal being issued. In response, from 2007, the Hong Kong Observatory broadened its network to eight near sea-level reference anemometers around Hong Kong. In 2013, Lau Fau Shan has replaced Wetland Park as a reference anemometer station. The current eight reference anemometer stations include Cheung Chau, Hong Kong International Airport, Sai Kung, Kai Tak, Lau Fau Shan, Tsing Yi Shell Oil Depot, Sha Tin and Ta Kwu Ling.

When Typhoon Hato hit Hong Kong in August 2017 with signal 10 being issued, flights were suspended or cancelled, resuming as soon as it was safe, including throughout the night to make up for loss time. MTR cancelled train services in open sections of the line, and maintained a limited service underground on an adjusted schedule. All schools were closed for the day and the government opened temporary shelters. Trees fell and flooding occurred. The stock market (and other businesses) were suspended for part or a whole day.

When Typhoon Mangkhut hit Hong Kong in September 2018 with signal 10 being issued, all of the above happened. The Hong Kong Weather Observatory and the Hong Kong Government advised people to put masking tape on their windows to try and stop their windows from being blown away.

Meaning of signals 
The Saffir–Simpson hurricane wind scale is a classification used for some Western Hemisphere tropical cyclones. Hong Kong has similar official five-level definition warning signals, which use descriptions of winds taken from the Beaufort Scale, as shown in the table below.  The Hong Kong levels, however do not correspond to the Beaufort Scale which has 12 levels.

The lowest level of the Hong Kong system No. 1 does not correspond to any wind strength.  Instead it is an alert based on the distance of a storm.

The highest level, Hurricane Signal No. 10, is issued infrequently. There have been 16 No. 10 warnings since 1946, of which three have occurred since 2010, for Typhoon Vicente in 2012, Typhoon Hato in 2017, and Typhoon Mangkhut in 2018. No. 10 warnings generally occur in intervals of around four years or less, except for the period from the 1980s to 2000s when only two such signals were issued, for Typhoon Ellen in 1983 and Typhoon York in 1999.

Signal numbers will change in accordance with the conditions.  The Hong Kong Observatory website gives live updates of issue and cancel times for signals.

Hong Kong Observatory public guidance
The Hong Kong Observatory has given public guidance when signals are given. This include:

When signal 1 is issued, to take into account in planning activities of a tropical cyclone and to be aware that strong winds may occur over offshore waters.

When signal 3 is issued, secure all loose objects, particularly on balconies and roof tops.

When signal 8 is issued, complete all precautions (such as secure all loose objects) before gales commence.

When signal 9 or 10 is issued, stay indoors and away from exposed windows and doors to avoid flying debris.

Macau counterpart
In Macau, the territory's Meteorological and Geophysical Bureau maintains a very similar system. The bureau has maintained the practice of hoisting the warning signals (as well as its nighttime light signals), even as Hong Kong abandoned the practice in 2002. The signals are hoisted at Guia Fortress and the Fortaleza do Monte. In 2017, Typhoon Hato also reached Signal number 10, but Macau raised the signal late, hours after Hong Kong.

See also 

 Hong Kong rainstorm warning signals
 Hong Kong Observatory

References

External links 
 Hong Kong's Tropical Cyclone Warning Signals
 Tropical Cyclone Warning Signals of Macao
 The day/night signals

1917 establishments in Hong Kong
Tropical cyclone meteorology
Climate of Hong Kong
Science and technology in Hong Kong
Emergency management in Hong Kong
Weather warnings and advisories